Thailand participated in the 2003 Asian Winter Games which were held in Aomori, Japan from 1–8 February 2003.

References

Nations at the 2003 Asian Winter Games
Asian Winter Games
Thailand at the Asian Winter Games